Mohd Zulkifli Yusof, is a Malaysian professional football player. He formerly played with Pahang FA and Perlis FA in the Malaysian Super League.

References

Living people
Malaysian footballers
1982 births
Perlis FA players
Association football defenders